Archie Latimer Hodgins (19 June 1876 – 4 July 1966) was a Canadian farmer and politician. Hodgins was a Progressive party member of the House of Commons of Canada. He was born in Ettrick, Ontario.

He was elected to Parliament at the Middlesex East riding in the 1921 general election. After serving his only federal term, the 14th Canadian Parliament, Hodgins was defeated by Adam King Hodgins of the Conservatives in the 1925 federal election.

External links
 

1876 births
1966 deaths
Canadian farmers
Members of the House of Commons of Canada from Ontario
People from Middlesex County, Ontario
Progressive Party of Canada MPs
Place of death missing